Qiantong is a town in southwestern Ninghai County in eastern Zhejiang province, China, situated along G15 Shenyang–Haikou Expressway around  southwest of the county seat as the crow flies. , it has 29 villages under its administration. The town was established in the last years of the Song Dynasty, though much of its architecture dates from the Ming or Qing; a large proportion of its residents are surnamed Tong.

See also 
 List of township-level divisions of Zhejiang

References 

Township-level divisions of Zhejiang